Badam Zar or Badamzar may refer to:
 Badam Zar, Bushehr
 Badamzar, Izeh, Khuzestan Province
 Badam Zar, Dehdez, Khuzestan Province